Joseph Thurston may refer to:

 Joe Thurston (born 1979), American baseball player
 Joseph Thurston (poet) (1704–1732), English poet